Let Me Touch Your Mind is a studio album by Ike & Tina Turner released on United Artists Records in 1973.

Recording and release 
Let Me Touch Your Mind was recorded at the Turners' Bolic Sound studio in 1972. The album package was designed to resemble a paper fortune teller.

The title track, "Let Me Touch Your Mind," was written by Oliver Sain and was released as the lead single in 1972. It reached No. 30 on Record World'''s R&B chart. "Early One Morning," The B-side to the non-album track "With A Little Help From My Friends," reached No. 47 on the Billboard Soul Singles chart in 1973. Roger Whittaker is credited as the songwriter, but the Turners rendition is a cover of Little Richard's "Early One Morning" which was released in 1958. Another track, "Help Him," was released later in 1973 as the B-side to the hit single "Nutbush City Limits." Both songs were written by Tina Turner.

 Critical reception 
Reviewing the album, Cash Box noted that "no act in the business comes close to this kind of excitement....On this one, they tackle quite a few blues and oldies: 'Early One Morning,' 'Annie Had A Baby' (Hank Ballard's controversial hit of the fifties), 'Up On The Roof' and even a soul try at 'Born Free.' But our favorite, besides the title tracks, is 'Popcorn,' which is a new tune.Record World (January 27, 1973): "Latest lp is best in many discs for these soul shakers. Album has some choice, curious selections, such as 'Born Free,' 'Up In The Roof' and 'Heaven Help Us All.' Tina's own raunchy 'Popcorn' is great fun, as is whole album."Billboard (February 3, 1973): "It is burningly energetic soul with Tina's uniquely sexy showmanship way out front on display, in a well-conceived program of Turner originals and covers. Duos next hit could be the slow-cooking title tune or Tina's lecture on mating 'Help Him.'"

 Reissues Let Me Touch Your Mind was reissued in 2011 by BGO Records on the compilation CD Workin' Together/Let Me Touch Your Mind.'' In 2018, the album was reissued on CD by Universal Music.

Track listing

Chart performance

References 

1973 albums
Ike & Tina Turner albums
Albums produced by Ike Turner
United Artists Records albums
Albums recorded at Bolic Sound